The MQR-16A Gunrunner was an unguided rocket developed by Atlantic Research during the 1960s. Designed with low cost as a priority, the MQR-16A was intended to act as a target drone for use in the development of man-portable surface-to-air missiles, and as a training target for the missile operators. Proving successful, the rocket served in the United States military until the 1980s.

Design and development
Developed in the late 1960s, the Gunrunner was designed as an inexpensive aerial target, unguided and flying on a ballistic path, for use by the United States Army and United States Navy during the development and testing of the FIM-43 Redeye man-portable surface-to-air missile.

The design and construction of the Gunrunner was kept as simple as possible, with the rocket's stabilizing fins using plywood in their construction, and the solid-fueled powerplant being that of the reliable and widely used High Velocity Aerial Rocket (HVAR). The nose of the rocket was equipped with an infrared enhancer to allow for all-aspect target acquisition by the missile that was engaging the target.

Operational history
Entering operational service in 1969, the Gunrunner was given the official designation of MQR-16A in 1971, and proved to be a success in service. Used for training soldiers in the operation of both the Redeye and the MIM-72 Chaparral SAMs, the missile was launched from a frame-type launcher that carried three missiles. Remaining in service until the mid-1980s, the Gunrunner was replaced in U.S. Army service by the MTR-15 BATS.

References

Notes

Bibliography

Target missiles
Cold War rockets of the United States
Military equipment introduced in the 1960s